Babi Yar, a ravine near Kyiv, was the scene of possibly the largest shooting massacre during the Holocaust. After the war, commemoration efforts encountered serious difficulty because of the policy of the Soviet Union. After the dissolution of the Soviet Union, a number of memorials have been erected. The creation of the Babyn Yar Holocaust Memorial Center was initiated in 2016.

Commemoration and Soviet policy 
Soviet leadership discouraged placing any emphasis on the Jewish aspect of the Babi Yar tragedy; instead, it presented these atrocities as crimes committed against the Soviet people in general and the inhabitants of Kyiv in particular. The first draft report of the Extraordinary State Commission (Чрезвычайная Государственная Комиссия), dated December 25, 1943 was officially censored in February 1944 as follows:

Monuments at Babi Yar 
After the war, several attempts were made to erect a memorial at Babi Yar to commemorate the fate of the Jewish victims. A turning point was Yevgeny Yevtushenko's 1961 poem on Babi Yar, which begins "Nad Babim Yarom pamyatnikov nyet" ("There are no monuments over Babi Yar"); it is also the first line of Shostakovitch's Symphony No. 13.

An official memorial to Soviet citizens shot at Babi Yar was erected in 1976. After the dissolution of the Soviet Union in 1991, the Ukrainian government allowed the establishment of a separate memorial specifically identifying the Jewish victims. The creation of the Babyn Yar Holocaust Memorial Center was initiated in 2016.

The monuments to commemorate the numerous events associated with Babi Yar tragedy include:
 Monument to Soviet citizens and POWs shot by the Nazi occupiers at Babi Yar (opened in July 1976).
 Menorah-shaped monument to the Jews (about 100,000) massacred at Babi Yar (opened on Sept. 29, 1991, 50 years after the first mass killing of the Jews at Babi Yar).
 Wooden cross in memory of the 621 Ukrainian nationalists (including Olena Teliha and her husband) murdered by the Germans in 1942 (installed in 1992)
 Oak Cross marking the place where two Ukrainian Orthodox Christian priests were shot on November 6, 1941, for anti-German agitation (installed in 2000)
 Monument to children killed at Babi Yar (opened in 2001 near the Dorohozhychi metro station).
 Magen David shaped stone marking the site for a planned Jewish community center (installed in 2001. Construction of the center was suspended, however, because of disputes over its specific location and scope of activities)
 Monument to Ostarbeiters and concentration camp prisoners (installed in 2005 at the corner of Dorohozhytska and Oranzheriyna St., close to the 1976 monument)
 Monument to victims of the 1961 Kurenivka mudslide in Kyiv (installed in 2006, 45 years after the disaster killed hundreds of local residents and workers)
 Monument to Tatiana Markus, a member of the anti-Nazi underground in Kiev, opened December 1, 2009.
 Three tombs over a steep ravine edge with black metal crosses, installed by an unknown volunteer. One cross has an inscription: "People were killed in 1941 at this place, too. May God rest their souls."
 Мonument "The Gypsy wagon" in memory of the victims of the Roma Genocide from 1941 to 1943, opened September 23, 2016.
 Monument Olena Teliha, unveiled on 25 February, 2017.
 Monument Crystal Wall of Crying, Marina Abramovic, 2021

Damage 

On the night of 16 July 2006, the memorial dedicated to the Jewish victims was vandalized. Several gravestones, the foundation of the commemorative sledge-stone, and several steps leading to the Menorah memorial were damaged. The Ministry of Foreign Affairs of Ukraine issued a statement condemning the act of vandalism.

On 1 March 2022, the complex which includes both the memorial and the cemetery for victims the Babi Yar massacre was hit by a missile attack carried out by the Russian Federation during the 2022 Russian invasion of Ukraine.

Images

Other memorials 

Alan G. Gass, FAIA, President of the Babi Yar Park Foundation that originally developed the Park with the City and County of Denver, stated:

There is a memorial to the victims of Babi Yar at the Nahalat Yitzhak Cemetery in Giv'atayim. The memorial was erected over bone fragments from Babi Yar that were reinterred at the cemetery. The bones were brought out of Ukraine by three American college students in July 1971. The memorial was dedicated in 1972 by the Prime Minister of Israel, Golda Meir. There is an annual ceremony on Yom HaShoah, the Holocaust Day.

A traffic island in Brighton Beach, Brooklyn, New York City (a neighborhood with a large Jewish and Russian population), was named Babi Yar Triangle in 1981, and renovated in 1988.

A memorial to the victims of the Babi Yar Massacre was erected in the Sydney suburb of Bondi on 28 September 2014, which has a large Russian-speaking Jewish community. The monument was unveiled by the Mayor of Waverley and the Federal Member, Malcolm Turnbull. The erection of the monument was an initiative of the Executive Council of Australian Jewry and its Public Affairs Director, Alexander Ryvchin, who was born in the city of Kyiv, where the massacre took place. The English portion of the inscription on the monument reads: "In memory of the Jews of Kiev, massacred at Babi Yar by the Nazis and their Ukrainian Collaborators, and in recognition of the suffering of Soviet Jewry."

Literature and film 

In his 1961 book Star in Eclipse: Russian Jewry Revisited, Joseph Schechtman provided an account of the Babi Yar tragedy. In 1966, Anatoly Kuznetsov's Babi Yar: A Document in the Form of a Novel was published in censored form in the Soviet monthly literary magazine Yunost. Kuznetsov began writing a memoir of his wartime life when he was 14. Over the years he continued working on it, adding documents and eyewitness testimony. He managed to smuggle 35 mm photographic film containing the uncensored manuscript when he defected, and the book was published in the West in 1970.

In 1985, a documentary film Babiy Yar: Lessons of History by Vitaly Korotich was made to mark the tragedy.

In 2021, it was released the documentary Babi Yar. Context by Ukrainian filmmaker Sergei Loznitsa. The film explores the prelude and aftermath of the massacre using footage shot by German and Soviet troops.

The massacre of Jews at Babi Yar has inspired artists. A poem was written by the Russian poet Yevgeny Yevtushenko; this in turn was set to music by Dmitri Shostakovich in his Symphony No. 13. An oratorio was composed by the Ukrainian composer Yevhen Stankovych to the text of Dmytro Pavlychko (2006). A number of films and television productions have also marked the tragic events at Babi Yar, and D. M. Thomas's novel The White Hotel uses the massacre's anonymity and violence as a counterpoint to the intimate and complex nature of the human psyche.

References

External links 
 Menorah Memorial in Babi Yar park, Kyiv To reach this park, take the metro to the Dorohozhychi station
  A monument to be erected to Olena Teliha
  Commemorative Oratorio by Yevhen Stankovych
  "Dress Code for Auschwitz" - Artwork from Babi Yar to Auschwitz
 Plan to build memorial at site of massacre in Ukraine divisive. by Vladimir Matveyev. NCSJ/Jewish Telegraphic Agency. July 24, 2006
 65th Anniversary Remembrance of the Babi Yar Tragedy September 27, 2006 (NCSJ)
 Declaration International Forum "Let My People Live!" September 27, 2006 (World Holocaust Forum)
 'From September to May, there were shots almost every day'. by Amiram Barkat. Haaretz September 29, 2006
 Ukraine’s disputes over the 80th anniversary of the Babi Yar massacre, article (describing main memorial sites and political background) at OSW
Babi Yar park a living holocaust memorial, at Mizel Museum 

Holocaust historiography
Holocaust commemoration
Monuments and memorials in Ukraine
Holocaust memorials
World War II memorials in Ukraine
Babi Yar